Nymphes myrmeleonides is an Australian insect in the order Neuroptera, known as the blue eyes lacewing. It is found in areas of New South Wales and Queensland. The larvae of N. myrmeleonides resemble antlions and construct pit traps by burrowing into loose soil.

References 

Nymphidae
Insects of Australia
Insects described in 1814